Andrija Paltašić also known as Andrija Paltašić-Kotoranin (1440–1500) was a Venetian printer and publisher who was active from 1476 to 1492. He was born in Kotor and was part of the Paltašić noble family. He moved to Venice in the 1470s where he became one of the first printers. He died in Venice in ca. 1500. Paltašić is the first known South Slavic printer.

Family 
He was born in Kotor, in the Albania Veneta (today's Montenegro) of the Republic of Venice, into an old Kotoran noble family, as son of Jakov Paltašić, and grandson of Radelja Paltašić. In 1470 another member of his family, Miloje Paltašić, also moved to Venice.

Work 

He printed books at Venice between 1476 and 1492. Along with him, Dobrić Dobričević from Lastovo also began working; the two published the works of Lactantius in 1479. Hieromonk Makarije learned printing skills from Paltašić. Paltašić died in Venice.

Paltašić is known to have printed the famous Greek and Roman works (by Cicero, Diodorus Siculus, Virgil, Terence, Ovid, Sextus Propertius, Juvenal, Tibullus, Catullus and others) as well as the works of humanist writers, historiographers and lexicographers. On top of this he also printed books concerning religion, such as the Bible in Italian.

Paltašić's works currently remain all over Europe. In Southeastern Europe, there remain 41 of his works, out of which 38 are kept in Croatia, with three in Montenegro.

See also
Paltašić family
Božidar Vuković
Božidar Goraždanin
Đurađ Crnojević
Stefan Marinović
Stefan Paštrović
Hieromonk Makarije
Hieromonk Mardarije
Hegumen Mardarije
Vićenco Vuković
Hieromonk Pahomije
Trojan Gundulić
Jakov of Kamena Reka
Bartolomeo Ginammi who followed Zagurović's footsteps reprinting Serbian books.
Dimitrije Ljubavić
Mojsije Dečanac
Inok Sava

Notes

References

External links
Hrv. znanstvena bibliografija Paltašić, Dobrićević Bilješke uz najstarije hrvatsko glazbeno tiskarstvo (in Croatian)
E-LIS Paltašić, Dobrićević bilješke uz najstarije hrvatsko glazbeno tiskarstvo (in Croatian)

Republic of Venice printers
Venetian period in the history of Montenegro
People from Kotor
1450 births
1500 deaths
15th-century translators
15th-century printers
Venetian Slavs